Sundareswarar Temple is a Hindu temple located at Neikuppai, about 25 kilometres from Kumbakonam. The temple is dedicated to Shiva.

Significance 
The temple is about 500–1000 years old and frequented by childless and unmarried people.

References 
 

Shiva temples in Thanjavur district